Minna Salami (born 1978) is a Finnish Nigerian journalist who has propagated information on African feminist issues, about the African diaspora, and Nigerian women through her award-winning blog MsAfropolitan, which she created and has been editing since 2010. The issues covered in the blog are "ranging from polygamy to feminism to relationships". Apart from blogging she also writes on social issues. She is represented on the Global Educator Network of Duke University, the Africa Network and The Guardian Books Network of The Guardian. Salami's blogs and articles are featured in The Guardian, Al Jazeera and The Huffington Post. She is the recipient of several national awards.

Biography 
Salami was born in Finland in 1978 to a Nigerian father and a Finnish mother. She was in Nigeria during her youth before she went to Sweden for higher studies. She graduated from Lund University, Sweden, with a Bachelor of Arts (BA) degree in Political Science, and from the University of London's School of Oriental and African Studies (SOAS) with a Master of Arts degree (MA). In 2016, she participated at the Hong Kong Baptist University International Writers’ Workshop as a fellow. She is proficient in five languages and has lived in Nigeria, Sweden, Spain, New York and London. She  operates from London.

Initially, after her education, Salami started her career as a marketing business executive, dealing with branding and management of products. She worked in many countries. Thereafter she founded the blog MsAfropolitan in 2010. It deals with issues related to Nigeria and the diaspora on feminist issues. Concurrently, for two years until 2012, she also promoted the MsAfropolitan Boutique, in recognition of the African Women's Decade 2010–2020. This online boutique sold many heritage goods of Africa, manufactured by women of Africa. In an interview with the "Weekend Magazine", Salami elaborating on the objective of her establishing the Ms.Afropolitan blog, stated: "Blogs about African society were male-dominant and the feminist blogs I came across were Eurocentric. Most of the African feminist writing I encountered was either academic or fiction writing. It was brilliant work...but I longed to read popular cultural commentary about Africa from a feminist angle and commentary about feminism from an African angle." She is a contributor to the 2019 anthology New Daughters of Africa, edited by Margaret Busby.

In 2019, Salami joined the Activate Collective  an intersectional feminist movement that seeks to raise money for minoritised women political candidates and community activists. In 2020, the Activate Collective announced it would fund 11 women running for five different parties in the spring local and mayoral elections across five regions of England – London, the Midlands, North East, North West, and Yorkshire and Humber. The list includes eight women of colour, one disabled woman and one care leaver. Seven of the 11 women are from low-income households or identify as working-class.

Salami also works as a consultant, in the digital medium, to TVC News, a pan-African news channel. She is represented on the board of the UK Charity For Books' Sake and a UK-based think tank.

In 2020, Amistad published a book of Salami's essays, Sensuous Knowledge: A Black Feminist Approach for Everyone.

Awards
Salami is the recipient of a number of awards such as the "40 African Change-makers under 40" of Applause Africa. She has been named one of "50 Remarkable Women Connected" by Nokia, one of "Nigeria's 100 most influential women" by of YNaija, and one of the "Top 100 Most Influential Black People on Digital/Social Media" by Eelan Media. She has also received the "Outstanding Achievement in Media" award in 2013, which is an Africa Diaspora Award, and the Women 4 Africa 2013 "Blogger of the Year" award. RED Magazine listed her as "Blogger of the Year" for 2012.

References

External links
 "Minna Salami – A Nigerian Trailblazer In Diaspora: Award winning Feminist", Nigerian Diasporan News, 19 March 2017.

1978 births
Alumni of SOAS University of London
Finnish people of Nigerian descent
Living people
Lund University alumni
Nigerian activists
Nigerian women activists
Nigerian journalists
Nigerian women journalists
Finnish bloggers
Finnish women bloggers
Finnish activists
Finnish women activists
Finnish journalists
Finnish women journalists
Nigerian bloggers
Nigerian women bloggers